Chenaran (also Romanized as Chenārān; also known as Ḩoseynkhān) is a village in Kashkan Rural District, Shahivand District, Dowreh County, Lorestan Province, Iran. At the 2006 census, its population was 284, in 55 families.

References 

Towns and villages in Dowreh County